Mikulov Castle is a castle in the town of Mikulov in South Moravian Region of the Czech Republic. The castle stands on a place of historic Slavonic settlement, where since the end of the 13th century the original stone castle was erected. The present castle is the result of a reconstruction in 1719–1730 under the princes of Dietrichstein. The end of World War II meant a complete disaster for the castle, as it was destroyed by fire whose origins are unclear.

During the war, the anthropological collection from the Moravské zemské muzeum had been moved to Mikulov Castle for safekeeping purposes. Many of the most important discoveries from Předmostí u Přerova, Dolní Věstonice and the Mladeč caves were destroyed by the fire.

After an extensive reconstruction in the 1950s, the castle became the seat of the Regional Museum in Mikulov, housing art and historical collections, including artifacts relating to the history of local wine production. The Renaissance wine barrel, dating from 1643 and one of the largest, wine barrels in Central Europe, is on display.

References

External links

Monuments in Mikulov 
Mikulov Castle homepage

Buildings and structures in Mikulov
Castles in the South Moravian Region
Museums in the South Moravian Region
History museums in the Czech Republic
Wine museums